The Bronze Grimoire is a supplement published by Chaosium in 1994 for the fantasy role-playing game Elric!, based on the novels by Michael Moorcock.

Contents
The Bronze Grimoire is an 80-page softcover book designed by Ross Isaacs, Lynn Willis and Mark Morrison, with interior art by Ben Monroe and cover art by Charlie Krank. The book provides new and expanded rules for Elric!, focusing on runes, necromancy, and magical tomes; the book also features fifty new spells, as well as a unique set of magic items.

Reception
In the October 1995 edition of Dragon (Issue #222), Rick Swan thought The Bronze Grimoire was "essential" for players of Elric! because of the new spells, and because the book "clarifies some of the game's murkier concepts." However, Swan thought the book lacked "staging tips, setting notes, or a unifying theme." He also noted that players needed to be familiar with the original Elric novels in order to understand some of the material. Swan concluded by giving the book an average rating of 4 out of 6.

Reviews
 Casus Belli #84 (Dec 1994)

References

Fantasy role-playing game supplements
Role-playing game supplements introduced in 1994